Dehnowiyeh may refer to:
 Dehnowiyeh, Zarand
 Dehnowiyeh, Yazdanabad, Zarand County